Frédéric Dubourdieu (31 December 1879 – 13 May 1944) was a French fencer. He competed at the 1908 and 1920 Summer Olympics.

References

External links
 

1879 births
1944 deaths
French male épée fencers
Olympic fencers of France
Fencers at the 1908 Summer Olympics
Fencers at the 1920 Summer Olympics